Ratarda mora is a moth in the family Cossidae. It is found on the island of Labuan.

Adults are black with circular white spots on the forewings.

References

Natural History Museum Lepidoptera generic names catalog

Ratardinae